Corbett Creek is a small watercourse that drains into Lake Ontario in Whitby, Ontario.
It drains .

To the west it borders on the watershed of Pringle Creek.  To the east it borders on the watershed of Oshawa Creek.

References

Tributaries of Lake Ontario
Rivers of the Regional Municipality of Durham